F. Scott Fitzgerald and 'The Last of the Belles' is a 1974 American made-for-television biographical romance drama film directed by George Schaefer and starring Susan Sarandon, Blythe Danner and Richard Chamberlain. The film, which is known as The Last of the Belles in Australia, was written by James Costigan based on F. Scott Fitzgerald's 1935 short story "The Last of the Belles".

Cast 
 Richard Chamberlain as F. Scott Fitzgerald
 Blythe Danner as Zelda Fitzgerald
 Susan Sarandon as Ailie Calhoun
 David Huffman as Andy McKenna
 Ernest Thompson as Earl Shoen
 Richard Hatch as Bill Knowles
 James Naughton as Captain John Haines
 Albert Stratton as John Biggs
 Alex Sheafe as Philippe
 Sasha von Scherler as Jeanette
 Thomas A. Stewart as Horace Canby
 Norman Barrs as Waiter
 Earl Sydnor as Oliver
 Brooke Adams as Kitty Preston
 Cynthia Woll as Mary Bly Harwood
 Tom Fitzsimmons as Don Cameron

External links 
 
 
 

1974 films
1974 television films
1974 romantic drama films
American romantic drama films
Biographical films about writers
Cultural depictions of F. Scott Fitzgerald
Films directed by George Schaefer
American drama television films
1970s American films